UGC 12591 is the third most massive known spiral galaxy, after ISOHDFS 27 and J2345-0449. It is located about 400 million light-years away from the Earth in the constellation Pegasus. In addition, it is the spiral galaxy with the highest known rotational speed of about 500 km/s, almost twice that of our galaxy, the Milky Way. The high rotational speed means the galaxy must be very massive at the center; the galaxy has a mass estimated at 4 times that of the Milky Way, making it the third of the most massive spiral galaxies known to date.

UGC 12591 is relatively isolated; the nearest galaxy to it is 3.55 million light-years (1.09 Mpc) away. However, its morphology suggests a merger or accretion event in its past: it is somewhat lenticular-like, with a central bulge and dust lanes reminiscent of the Sombrero Galaxy.

References

External links
 

12591
071392
Pegasus (constellation)
Spiral galaxies
+05-55-015